Evergreen Lake is a  reservoir located in McLean County, Illinois and Woodford County, Illinois. Created by damming Six Mile Creek, it was built for recreation, sport fishing, and water supply purposes. The nearest town is Kappa, Illinois, north of Normal, Illinois.

Evergreen Lake is managed for crappie fishing.  There is a 10-h.p. power limit on the lake.

References

Evergreen
Bodies of water of McLean County, Illinois
Bodies of water of Woodford County, Illinois